Samudram is a 1977 Indian Malayalam-language film, directed by K. Sukumaran Nair. The film stars Prem Nazir, Sheela, Jayabharathi and Adoor Bhasi. The film has musical score by G. Devarajan.

Cast
 
Prem Nazir as Rajashekharan
Sheela as Omana
Jayabharathi as Shobhana
Adoor Bhasi as Eswara Pillai
Thikkurissy Sukumaran Nair as principal
Jose as Ravi 
Sreelatha Namboothiri as Vilasini
T. R. Omana 
Baby Sumathi 
Bahadoor as Shekhar Das
Prathapachandran as Omana's father
Ravikumar as Mohan
T. P. Madhavan as police officer
Vanchiyoor Radha
 Master Sekhar
Baby Indira

Soundtrack
The music was composed by G. Devarajan and the lyrics were written by Yusufali Kechery.

References

External links
 

1977 films
1970s Malayalam-language films